Langston Fishburne (born February 29, 1988) is an American actor.

Career

Fishburne is the son of actor Laurence Fishburne and his first wife Hajna O. Moss, a casting director. Langston studied ballet while in New York City and began attending Boston University. Langston entered acting himself and had a recurring role in the web series Vanessa & Jan on WIGS. He appeared in the 2018 film Ant-Man and the Wasp as a younger version of Bill Foster, with the older version played by his father.

Filmography

Film/Movie

Television

References

External links

1988 births
21st-century American male actors
African-American male actors
Boston University alumni
Living people
Male actors from New York (state)
21st-century African-American people
20th-century African-American people